Marisa de Azevedo Monte (Brazilian Portuguese: /maˈɾizɐ dʒi azeˈvedu ˈmõtʃi/) (born 1 July 1967) is a Brazilian singer, composer, instrumentalist, and producer of Brazilian popular music and samba. As of 2011, she had sold 10 million albums worldwide and has won numerous national and international awards, including four Latin Grammys, seven Brazilian MTV Video Music Awards, nine Multishow de Música Brasileira awards, 5 APCAs, and six Prêmio TIM de Música. Marisa is considered by Rolling Stone Brasil to be the second greatest singer, behind only Elis Regina. She also has two albums (MM and Verde, Anil, Amarelo, Cor-de-Rosa e Carvão) on the list of the 100 best albums of Brazilian music.

Biography
Monte was born in Rio de Janeiro, daughter of the engineer Carlos Saboia Monte and Sylvia Marques de Azevedo Monte. On her father's side, she is descended from the Saboias, one of the oldest Italian families in Brazil. She studied singing, piano, and drums as a child, and began studying opera singing at 14.

After failing to break through into 1980s Brazilian pop rock she went into semi-exile in Italy, where she met the famous producer Nelson Motta. Thereafter she became a hybrid of MPB diva and pop rock performer. While most of her music is in the style of modern MPB, she has also recorded traditional samba and folk tunes, largely in collaboration with such musicians and songwriters as Carlinhos Brown, Arnaldo Antunes, and Nando Reis and producer Arto Lindsay. She has also collaborated with the New York pop music vanguard, including Laurie Anderson, David Byrne, Marc Ribot, Bernie Worrell and Philip Glass.

Career
Monte owns the rights to all of her songs; it was her chief demand for renewing her contract with EMI Music.

She also released her single "Não é Proibido", which was also used in the soundtrack of a video game by EA Sports, 2010 FIFA World Cup South Africa.

Discography

Live albums

Compilation albums

Video albums

References

External links
 
 French site on Marisa Monte

1967 births
Living people
20th-century Brazilian women singers
20th-century Brazilian singers
Brazilian mezzo-sopranos
Brazilian people of Italian descent
Brazilian people of Portuguese descent
Brazilian women guitarists
Latin Grammy Award winners
Música Popular Brasileira singers
Música Popular Brasileira guitarists
Musicians from Rio de Janeiro (city)
Brazilian women singer-songwriters
21st-century Brazilian women singers
21st-century Brazilian singers
Women in Latin music